WPLY may refer to:

 WPLY (AM), a radio station (610 AM) licensed to serve Roanoke, Virginia, United States
 WPLY (defunct), a defunct radio station (960 AM) formerly licensed to serve Mount Pocono, Pennsylvania, United States
 WFYX, a radio station (96.3 FM) licensed to Walpole, New Hampshire, United States, which held the call sign WPLY-FM from 2005 to 2008
 WRNB, a radio station (100.3 FM) licensed to serve Media, Pennsylvania, which held the call sign WPLY from 1993 to 2005
 WGXI, a radio station (1420 AM) licensed to serve Plymouth, Wisconsin, United States, which held the call sign WPLY until 1991